In the mathematical field of Galois cohomology, the local Euler characteristic formula is a result due to John Tate that computes the Euler characteristic of the group cohomology of the absolute Galois group GK of a non-archimedean local field K.

Statement
Let K be a non-archimedean local field, let Ks denote a separable closure of K, let GK = Gal(Ks/K) be the absolute Galois group of K, and let Hi(K, M) denote the group cohomology of GK with coefficients in M. Since the cohomological dimension of GK is two, Hi(K, M) = 0 for i ≥ 3. Therefore, the Euler characteristic only involves the groups with i = 0, 1, 2.

Case of finite modules
Let M be a GK-module of finite order m. The Euler characteristic of M is defined to be

(the ith cohomology groups for i ≥ 3 appear tacitly as their sizes are all one).

Let R denote the ring of integers of K. Tate's result then states that if m is relatively prime to the characteristic of K, then

i.e. the inverse of the order of the quotient ring R/mR.

Two special cases worth singling out are the following. If the order of M is relatively prime to the characteristic of the residue field of K, then the Euler characteristic is one. If K is a finite extension of the p-adic numbers Qp, and if vp denotes the p-adic valuation, then

where [K:Qp] is the degree of K over Qp.

The Euler characteristic can be rewritten, using local Tate duality, as

where M′ is the local Tate dual of M.

Notes

References
 
 , translation of  Cohomologie Galoisienne, Springer-Verlag Lecture Notes 5 (1964).

Algebraic number theory
Galois theory